Yanac Railway Station was a railway station on the Yanac railway line. It was opened when the line was extended from Netherby and ran its last regularly scheduled passenger service sometime in the 1950s, closing to all traffic in 1986.

References 

Disused railway stations in Victoria (Australia)